Tharindu Thushan (born 9 October 1989) is a Sri Lankan first-class cricketer who plays for Panadura Sports Club.

References

External links
 

1989 births
Living people
Sri Lankan cricketers
Panadura Sports Club cricketers